This is a list of notable male professional kickboxers.

A 

 Donegi Abena
 Lukas Achterberg
 Thomas Adamandopoulos
 Serhiy Adamchuk
 Romie Adanza
 Armando González

 Benjamin Adegbuyi
 Israel Adesanya
 Peter Aerts
 Ryo Aitaka
 Vitali Akhramenko
 Zhora Akopyan
 Damien Alamos
 Cosmo Alexandre
 Dennis Alexio
 Hamid Amni
 Ayinta Ali
 Thomas Alizier
 Chingiz Allazov
 César Almeida
 Hiromi Amada
 Andre Amade
 Mosab Amrani
 Rukiya Anpo
 Fabiano Aoki
 Alex Rivas
 Jia Aoqi
 Shoa Arii
 Chalid Arrab
 Hirotaka Asahisa
 Taio Asahisa
 Ryusei Ashizawa
 Dzhabar Askerov
 Pacôme Assi
 Ionuţ Atodiresei
 Fabrice Aurieng
 Yuksel Ayaydin
 Murat Aygun
 Timur Aylyarov
 Iraj Azizpour

B 

 Melsik Baghdasaryan
 Xhavit Bajrami
 Boubaker El Bakouri
 Ashwin Balrak
 Gilbert Ballantine
 Buakaw Banchamek
 Petchtanong Banchamek
 Superbon Banchamek
 Wayne Barrett
 Pat Barry
 Xavier Bastard
 Jamie Bates
 Moises Baute
 Christian Baya
  Kyar Ba Nyein
 Saw Ba Oo
 Karim Bennoui
 Jamal Ben Saddik
 Yousri Belgaroui
 Dino Belošević
 Cyril Benzaquen
 Shemsi Beqiri
 Mike Bernardo
 Yuri Bessmertny
 Tyjani Beztati
 Dmitry Bezus
 Fang Bian
 Dany Bill
 Guerric Billet
 Randy Blake
 Josip Bodrozic
 Ulrik Bokeme
 Remy Bonjasky
 Rafi Bohic
 Marc de Bonte
 Astemir Borsov
 Francois Botha
 Gabriel Bozan
 Ricardo van den Bos
 Zhao Boshi
 Yassine Boughanem
 Youssef Boughanem
 Mohammed Boutasaa
  Anvar Boynazarov
 Mourad Bouzidi
 Sem Braan
 Bjorn Bregy
 Mladen Brestovac
 Clifton Brown
 Igor Bugaenko
 Ilias Bulaid
 Curtis Bush

C 

 Redouan Cairo
 Diogo Calado
 Sorin Căliniuc
 Allessandro Campagna
 Shane Campbell
 Lucien Carbin
 Gabriele Casella
 Saulo Cavalari
 Abderrahim Chafay
 Faldir Chahbari
 Wan Chai
 Shane Chapman
 Lone Chaw
 Mikhail Chalykh
 Andrei Chekhonin
 Giga Chikadze
 Rick Cheek
 David Chibana
 Hong Man Choi
 Gregory Choplin
 Lerdsila Chumpairtour
 Jomthong Chuwattana
 Lamsongkram Chuwattana
 Branko Cikatić
 Sebastian Ciobanu
 Robin Ciric
 Sean Clancy
 Roberto Cocco
 Vuyisile Colossa
 Carlos Condit
 Zhao Chongyang
 Dale Cook
 Dewey Cooper
 Sebastian Cozmâncă
 Kit Cope
 Nathan Corbett
 César Córdoba
 Bruce Codron
 Abdarhmane Coulibaly
 Nico Carrillo

D 

 Sanny Dahlbeck
 Paul Daley
 Lloyd van Dams
 Raymond Daniels
 Daniel Dawson
 Ramon Dekkers
 Erhan Deniz
 Dida Diafat
 Murat Direkçi
 Jonathan Di Bella
 Simon Dore
 Cédric Doumbé
 Brian Douwes
 Gago Drago
 Michael Duut

E 

 Marvin Eastman
 Mutsuki Ebata
 Rui Ebata
 Ben Edwards
 Regian Eersel
 Yuki Egawa
 Khalid El Bakouri
 Ibrahim El Bouni
 Ibrahim El Boustati
 Ilias Ennahachi
 Serdar Yiğit Eroğlu
 Hamza Essalih
 Eric Esch
 Abdellah Ezbiri
 Stavros Exakoustidis

F 

 Naruepol Fairtex
 Yodsanklai Fairtex
 Johann Fauveau
 Glaube Feitosa
 Francisco Filho
 Mirko Filipović
 Djany Fiorenti
 Daniel Forsberg
 Charles François
 Arashi Fujihara
 Yusuke Fujimoto
 Toshio Fujiwara

G 

 Nong-O Gaiyanghadao
 Daniel Puertas Gallardo
 Eduard Gafencu
 Bruno Gazani
 Meng Gaofeng
 Hicham El Gaoui
 Elvis Gashi
 Andrey Gerasimchuk
 Hesdy Gerges
 Mohammad Ghaedibardeh
 Karim Ghajji
 Abiral Ghimire
 Daniel Ghiţă
 Manson Gibson
 Frank Giorgi
 İbrahim Giydirir
 Michał Głogowski
 Konstantin Gluhov
 Massaro Glunder
 Rodney Glunder
 Enriko Gogokhia
 Gary Goodridge
 Denis Grachev
 Peter Graham
 Sam Greco
 Harut Grigorian
 Marat Grigorian
 Murthel Groenhart
 Franck Gross
 Brice Guidon
 Ali Gunyar
 Sergei Gur
 Vitaly Gurkov

H

 Chahid Oulad El Hadj
 Mustapha Haida
 Zinedine Hameur-Lain
 Akram Hamidi
 Ryu Hanaoka
 Dzianis Hancharonak
 Kento Haraguchi
 Antoni Hardonk
 Badr Hari
 Liam Harrison
 Lee Hasdell
 Kenta Hayashi
 Mohamed Hendouf
 Javier Hernandez
 Ivan Hippolyte
 Ren Hiramoto
 Ryoga Hirano
 Hiroya
 Koudai Hirayama
 Hyuma Hitachi
 Russ Hogue
 Ky Hollenbeck
 Martin Holm
 Nieky Holzken
 Henri Hooft
 Ernesto Hoost
 Hiraku Hori
 Tomáš Hron
 Andy Hug
 Mark Hunt
 Ondřej Hutník

I 

 Ionuţ Iftimoaie
 Alexey Ignashov
 Koji Ikeda
 Danyo Ilunga
 Toby Imada
 Guto Inocente
 Issei Ishii
 Satoshi Ishii
 Naoki Ishikawa
 Kan Itabashi

J 

 Dustin Jacoby
 Aziz Jahjah
 Corentin Jallon
 Duncan Airlie James
 Łukasz Jarosz
 Singh Jaideep
 Josh Jauncey
 Pawel Jedrzejczyk
 Qiu Jianliang
 Troy Jones
 Dragan Jovanović
 Wang Junguang
 Igor Jurković

K 

 K-Jee
 Besim Kabashi
 Kaoklai Kaennorsing
 Leroy Kaestner
 Kona Kato
 Anuwat Kaewsamrit
 Nobuaki Kakuda
 Virgil Kalakoda
 Rob Kaman
 Shoki Kaneda
 Akihiro Kaneko
 Tsubasa Kaneko
 Florent Kaouachi
 Ruslan Karaev
 Karapet Karapetyan
 Sina Karimian
 Dawid Kasperski
 Yuki Kasahara
 Hisaki Kato
 Yugo Kato
 Taiga Kawabe
 Ryuji Kajiwara
 Kyo Kawakami
 Shuji Kawarada
 Enriko Kehl
 Freddy Kemayo
 Mohammed Khamal
 Batu Khasikov
 Sergei Kharitonov
 Tarik Khbabez
 Jomhod Kiatadisak
 Petpanomrung Kiatmuu9
 Rungnarai Kiatmuu9
 Superlek Kiatmuu9
 Changpuek Kiatsongrit
 Yasuhiro Kido
 Minoru Kimura
 Taiei Kin
 Davit Kiria
 Satoshi Kobayashi
 Kaisei Kondo
 Takayuki Kohiruimaki
 Koji
 Koki
 Kosuke Komiyama
 Moussa Konaté
 Souleimane Konate
 Yoann Kongolo
 Stoyan Koprivlenski
 Andrei Kotsur
 Nikita Kozlov
 Albert Kraus
 Rustemi Kreshnik
 Jörgen Kruth
 Roman Kryklia
 Kenji Kubo
 Yuta Kubo
 Alexei Kudin
 Andrei Kulebin
 Sergey Kulyaba
 Mladen Kujundžić
 Ryusei Kumagai
 Masashi Kumura
 Shuhei Kumura
 Toma Kuroda
 Phet Utong Or. Kwanmuang
 Saeksan Or. Kwanmuang
 Fabio Kwasi
 Moe Kyoe
 Artur Kyshenko

L 

 Florin Lambagiu
 Ștefan Lătescu
 Sergei Lascenko
 Ole Laursen
 Cung Le
 Jérôme Le Banner
 Dave Leduc
 Chan Hyung Lee
 Su Hwan Lee
 Xie Lei
 Stefan Leko
 Jean-Claude Leuyer
 Artem Levin
 Joe Lewis
 Yohan Lidon
 Scott Lighty
 Soe Lin Oo
 Chi Bin Lim
 Alviar Lima
 Mirdi Limani
 Chike Lindsay
 Raphaël Llodra
 Frank Lobman
 Ismael Londt
 Yi Long
 Stan Longinidis
 Coban Lookchaomaesaitong
 Jorge Loren
 Duane Ludwig
 Alexandru Lungu
 Tun Lwin Moe

M 

 Abdallah Mabel
 Bruce Macfie
 Ariel Machado
 Keijiro Maeda
 Magomed Magomedov
 Nordine Mahieddine
 Elias Mahmoudi
 Eduardo Maiorino
 Petar Majstorovic
 Azem Maksutaj
 Malaipet
 Sher Mamazulunov
 Jin Mandokoro
 Cedric Manhoef
 Melvin Manhoef
 Andre Mannaart
 Roel Mannaart
 Simon Marcus
 D'Angelo Marshall
 Boy Boy Martin
 Masato
 Sergej Maslobojev
 Ariel Mastov
 Alka Matewa
 Shintaro Matsukura
 Adrian Maxim
 Jonathan Mayezo
 Rob McCullough
 Michael McDonald
 Steve McKinnon
 James McSweeney
 Aikpracha Meenayothin
 Chanalert Meenayothin
 Joerie Mes
 Dmitry Menshikov
 Mohamed Mezouari
 Kazuki Miburo
 Thiago Michel
 Savvas Michael
 Felipe Micheletti
 Igor Mihaljević
 Teo Mikelić
 Toni Milanović
 Jarrell Miller
 Mark Miller
 Ludovic Millet
 Tun Tun Min
 Vladimir Mineev
 Yang Ming
 Vitor Miranda
 Fukashi Mizutani
 Keisuke Monguchi
 Anatoly Moiseev
 Soren Monkongtong
 Gaylord Montier
 Yosuke Morii
 Vladimír Moravčík
 Remigijus Morkevičius
 Cătălin Moroşanu
 Mostafa Mosadegh
 Vang Moua
 Gegard Mousasi
 Tomáš Možný
 Steve Moxon
 Chaz Mulkey
 Frank Muñoz
 Yuta Murakoshi
 Musashi
 Zack Mwekassa

N 

 Alim Nabiev
 Kazane Nagai
 Yuichiro Nagashima
 Eddy Nait Slimani
 Taiki Naito
 Chihiro Nakajima
 Hiroki Nakajima
 Kan Nakamura
 Ryota Nakano
 Antz Nansen
 Jo Nattawut
 Jadamba Narantungalag
 Tenshin Nasukawa
 Petro Nakonechnyi
 Marcio Navarro
 Saw Nga Man
 Alain Ngalani
 Chris Ngimbi
 Hamza Ngoto
 Takahito Niimi
 Stéphane Nikiéma
 Wei Ninghui
 Masaaki Noiri
 K. J. Noons
  Samingdet Nor.Anuwatgym
 Jan Nortje

O 

 Arnold Oborotov
 Marcus Öberg
 Shane Oblonsky
 Volkan Oezdemir
 Eisaku Ogasawara
 Kenichi Ogata
 Takaya Ogura
 Tatsuya Oiwa
 Ryuya Okuwaki
 Alexander Oleinik
 Jonatan Oliveira
 Andy Ologun
 Ryunosuke Omori
 Kaito Ono
 Rade Opačić
 Henri van Opstal
 Ștefan Orza
 Kazuki Osaki
 Koki Osaki
 Fumiya Osawa
 Haruaki Otsuki
 L'houcine Ouzgni
 Alistair Overeem
 Valentijn Overeem
 Jay Overmeer
 Keiji Ozaki
 Kaito Ozawa
 Tayfun Ozcan
 Serkan Ozcaglayan
 Yetkin Özkul

P 

 Nenad Pagonis
 Pajonsuk
 Alexei Papin
 Amansio Paraschiv
 Sahak Parparyan
 John Wayne Parr
 Samart Payakaroon
 Zhang Peimian
 Alex Pereira
 Capitan Petchyindee Academy
 Petchdam Petchyindee Academy
 Praewprao PetchyindeeAcademy
 Sorgraw Petchyindee
 Tosca Petridis
 Armen Petrosyan
 Giorgio Petrosyan
 Koichi Pettas
 Leona Pettas
 Nicholas Pettas
 Seth Petruzelli
 James Phillips
 Eh Phoutong
 Jordann Pikeur
 Parviz Abdullayev
 Mickael Piscitello
 Yodlekpet Or. Pitisak
 Marek Piotrowski
 Fabio Pinca
 Marco Piqué
 Aleksandr Pitchkounov
 Muangthai PKSaenchaimuaythaigym
 Pakorn P.K. Saenchai Muaythaigym
 Saensatharn P.K. Saenchai Muaythaigym
 Lukasz Plawecki
 Antonio Plazibat
 Slavo Polugic
 Sergey Ponomarev
 Dževad Poturak
 Yodwicha Por Boonsit
 Agron Preteni
 Saiyok Pumpanmuang

Q 

 Wang Qiang
 Lin Qiangbang
 Patrice Quarteron

R 

 F-16 Rachanon
 Goran Radonjic
 Behzad Rafigh Doust
 Ramazan Ramazanov
 Superbank Mor Ratanabandit
 Yannick Reine
 José Reis
 Luis Reis
 Jordi Requejo
 Brad Riddell
 Levi Rigters
 Alessandro Riguccini
 Marcos Rios
 Jonay Risco
 Cristian Ristea
 Andy Ristie
 Wendell Roche
 Tsotne Rogava
 Darren Rolland
 Abraham Roqueñi
 Robin van Roosmalen
 Shane del Rosario
 Kevin Rosier
 Kevin Ross
 Ben Rothwell
 Jeff Roufus
 Rick Roufus
 Fred Royers
 Jairzinho Rozenstruik
 Constantin Rusu
 Bas Rutten
 Wei Rui

S 

 Bobo Sacko
 Kaonar P.K.SaenchaiMuaythaiGym
 Kongsak Saenchaimuaythaigym
 Muangthai P.K. Saenchaimuaythaigym
 Suakim PK Saenchaimuaythaigym
 Tawanchai PK Saenchaimuaythaigym
 Shwe Sai
 Haruma Saikyo
 Yuma Saikyo
 Kaito Sakaguchi
 Gökhan Saki
 Dylan Salvador
 Daniel Sam
 Zabit Samedov
 Samy Sana
 Simón Santana
 Bob Sapp
 Daizo Sasaki
 Junki Sasaki
 Masaaki Satake
 Sajad Sattari
 Mahmoud Sattari
 Detrit Sathian Gym
 Yoshihiro Sato
 Satoruvashicoba
 Taiki Sawatani
 Junichi Sawayashiki
 Roman Shcherbatiuk
 Joe Schilling
 Semmy Schilt
 Kotaro Shimano
 Ray Sefo
 Takeru Segawa
 Umar Semata
 Endy Semeleer
 Riamu Sera
 Dmitry Shakuta
 Kengo Shimizu
 Asahi Shinagawa
 Yuto Shinohara
 Tatsuki Shinotsuka
 Vasily Shish
 Hiroki Shishido
 Shirō
 Huang Shuailu
 Fabio Siciliani
 Fred Sikking
 Mighty Mo Siligia
 Anderson Silva
  Antônio Silva
 Rayen Simson
 Sirimongkol Singwangcha
 Apidej Sit Hrun
 Nong-O Sit Or
 Yodkhunpon Sitmonchai
 Kem Sitsongpeenong
 Sitthichai Sitsongpeenong
 Thongchai Sitsongpeenong
 Littewada Sitthikul
 Václav Sivák
 Jean-Charles Skarbowsky
 Daniel Škvor
 Valentin Slavikovski
 Paul Slowinski
 Peter Smit
 Maurice Smith
 Patrick Smith
 Yasuomi Soda
 Kongthoranee Sor.Sommai
 Dejdamrong Sor Amnuaysirichoke
 Petch Sor Chitpattana
 Jawsuayai Sor.Dechaphan
 Sudsakorn Sor Klinmee
 Saenchai Sor Kingstar
 Bovy Sor Udomson
 Ciprian Sora
 Jan Soukup
 Andy Souwer
 Cristian Spetcu
 Tyrone Spong
 Ivan Stanić
 Daniel Stefanovski
 Alexander Stetsurenko
 Warren Stevelmans
 Giannis Stoforidis
 Andrei Stoica
 Bogdan Stoica
 Ivan Strugar
 Lee Sung-hyun
 Pajonsuk SuperPro Samui
 Stephane Susperregui
 Jason Suttie
 Hiroaki Suzuki
 Masahiko Suzuki
 Muslim Salikhov

T 

 Jordan Tai
 Gunji Taito
 Kozo Takeda
 Yoshiki Takei
 Shota Takiya
 Masaki Takeuchi
 Toki Tamaru
 Toma Tanabe
 Naoki Tanaka
 Akebono Tarō
 Andrew Tate
 Luis Tavares
 Ewerton Teixeira
 Takumi Terada
 Nobuchika Terado
 Ryoga Terayama
 Thanonchai Thanakorngym
 Dieselnoi Chor Thanasukarn
 Jean-Yves Thériault
 Sangmanee Sor Tienpo
 Tim Thomas
 Michael Thompson
 Andrew Thomson
 Alex Tobiasson Harris
 Turpal Tokaev
 Marko Tomasović
 Gregory Tony
 Too Too
 Ognjen Topic
 Diesellek TopkingBoxing
 Mohamed Touchassie
 Cédric Tousch
 Tatsuya Tsubakihara
 Constantin Țuțu
 Vlad Tuinov
 Tun Tun Min
 Gary Turner
 Wayne Turner

U 

 Perry Ubeda
 Taisei Umei
  Genji Umeno
  Hirotaka Urabe
  Koya Urabe
 Benny Urquidez
 Alexander Ustinov
 Mamuka Usubyan

V 

 Artem Vakhitov
 Bart Vale
 Dmitry Valent
 Joseph Valtellini
 Kevin VanNostrand
 Jorge Varela
 Gabriel Varga
 Péter Varga
 Valdrin Vatnikaj
 Petr Vondracek
 Igor Vovchanchyn
 Jean-Claude Van Damme
 Jean-Paul van Tongeren
 Jayson Vemoa
 Santino Verbeek
 Rico Verhoeven
 Filip Verlinden
 Stjepan Veselic
 Sergey Veselkin
 Farid Villaume
 Doug Viney
 Silviu Vitez
 Maxim Vorovski
 Ginty Vrede

W 

 Steven Wakeling
 Hiromi Wajima
 Bill Wallace
 Brecht Wallis
 Nicolas Wamba
 James Warring
 Hinata Watanabe
 Kazuhisa Watanabe
 Jordan Watson
 Adam Watt
 Gonnapar Weerasakreck
 Wang Wenfeng
 Han Wenbao
 Priest West
 Sergio Wielzen
 Jahfarr Wilnis
 Jason Wilnis
 Don "The Dragon" Wilson
 Donovan Wisse
 Orono Wor Petchpun
 Phetmorakot Wor Sangprapai
 Rungkit Wor.Sanprapai
 Dennis Wosik

X 

 Wu Xuesong
 Françesco Xhaja

Y 

 YA-MAN
 Şahin Yakut
 Kenta Yamada
 Kosei Yamada
 Koyata Yamada
 Genki Yamamoto
 Masahiro Yamamoto
 Norifumi Yamamoto
 Yuya Yamamoto
 Tetsuya Yamato
 Hideaki Yamazaki
 Xu Yan
 Ryūshi Yanagisawa
 Haruto Yasumoto
 Jegish Yegoian
 Mite Yine
 Jin Ying
 Tomoya Yokoyama
 Koji Yoshimoto
 Nadaka Yoshinari
 Yuki Yoza
 Yuki
 Gilbert Yvel

Z 

 Jiri Zak
 Faisal Zakaria
 Mike Zambidis
 Danilo Zanolini
 Mehdi Zatout
 Deng Zeqi
 Amir Zeyada
 Yang Zhuo
 Pavel Zhuravlev
 Aslanbek Zikreev
 Errol Zimmerman
 Stevan Živković
 Cătălin Zmărăndescu
 Emil Zoraj
 Zakaria Zouggary
 Henriques Zowa
 Dzianis Zuev

See also

List of female kickboxers
List of Muay Thai practitioners
List of Lethwei fighters

Kickboxers
male